The Hong Kong men's national field hockey team represents Hong Kong in men's international field hockey competitions.

Tournament record

Summer Olympics
1964 – 15th place

Asian Games
1962 – 6th place
1966 – 7th place
1970 – 7th place
1978 – 5th place
1982 – 8th place
1986 – 6th place
1990 – 7th place
1998 – 8th place
2002 – 8th place
2006 – 9th place
2010 – 9th place
2018 – 12th place

Asia Cup
1999 – 8th place
2003 – 7th place
2007 – 8th place

AHF Cup
1997 – 
2002 – 
2008 – 7th place
2012 – 8th place
2016 –

Hockey World League
2012–13 – Round 1
2014–15 – Round 1
2016–17 – Round 1

Hockey Series
2018–19 – First Round

Current squad

See also
 Hong Kong women's national field hockey team

References

National team
Asian men's national field hockey teams
field hockey